Krishnaswamy is an Indian name and may refer to:

S. Krishnaswamy Aiyangar (1871–1946), Indian historian, academician and Dravidologist
Puliyur Krishnaswamy Duraiswami (1912–1974), Indian orthopedic surgeon, medical writer, Director General of Health Services
Alladi Krishnaswamy Iyer (1883–1953), Indian lawyer and member of the Constituent Assembly of India
V. Krishnaswamy Iyer (1863–1911), Indian lawyer and High Court judge of Madras
Krishnaswamy Kasturirangan (born 1940), Indian space scientist, headed the Indian Space Research Organisation 1994–2003
A. Krishnaswamy (born 1965), member of the 14th Lok Sabha of India
J. Krishnaswamy (born 1932), former footballer who represented India at the 1956 Summer Olympics
K. A. Krishnaswamy (1932–2010), Indian politician and minister in the Government of Tamil Nadu
K. Krishnaswamy, physician, social worker, Indian politician, former Member of the Legislative Assembly of Tamil Nadu
Kamala Krishnaswamy, Indian scientist in nutrition
S. Krishnaswamy, Indian documentary film-maker and writer who won the Padmashri award in 2009
Sakthi Krishnaswamy, Tamil film writer from the 1950s to the 1970s
Srinivasapuram Krishnaswamy (born 1943), the 19th Chief of Air Staff (India) from 2001 to 2004
Rasipuram Krishnaswamy Iyer Laxman (1921–2015), Indian cartoonist, illustrator, and humorist
Damal Krishnaswamy Pattammal (1919–2009), Indian Carnatic musician and a playback singer for film songs in Tamil
C. R. Krishnaswamy Rao (1927–2013), administrator and civil servant
K. Krishnaswamy Rao, CIE (1845–1923), Indian civil servant, judge and administrator, Diwan of Travancore 1898–1904
Krishnaswamy Subrahmanyam (1929–2011), international strategic affairs analyst, journalist and former Indian civil servant
Krishnaswamy Sundarji, PVSM (1930–1999), the Chief of Army Staff of the Indian Army from 1986 to 1988
Krishnaswamy VijayRaghavan (born 1954), professor and former director of The National Centre for Biological Sciences
Krishnaswamy Natarajan (born 1961), Director General of the Indian Coast Guard

See also
A. T. Krishnaswamy, 1941 Tamil comedy film
Evoor Major Sri krishnaswamy temple, Krishna temple in Evoor near Haripad, Alappuzha, Kerala, India
Chittoor Sree Krishnaswamy Temple, at South Chittoor in the city of Kochi, India, is a temple dedicated to Lord Krishna
Puthoorppilly Sree Krishnaswamy Temple at Manjapra, a small village in Ernakulam District, Kerala, India